Fred Aloisius Borak (May 30, 1913 – June 7, 2009) was a defensive end in the National Football League. He was a member of the Green Bay Packers during the 1938 NFL season. He served in the military during World War II and was a public safety officer with the Allied military government in Italy in 1945. He was promoted to the rank of major.

References

1913 births
2009 deaths
American football defensive ends
Creighton Bluejays football players
Green Bay Packers players
Wisconsin Badgers football players
Players of American football from Wisconsin
Sportspeople from the Chicago metropolitan area
Sportspeople from Kenosha, Wisconsin